Rudolf Hauser (born 22 November 1937) is a Swiss former racing cyclist. He was the Swiss National Road Race champion in 1964. He also rode in the 1967 Tour de France.

Major results
1963
 1st Tour du Nord-Ouest
 2nd Wartenberg Rundfahrt
1964
 1st  Road race, National Road Championships

References

External links
 

1937 births
Living people
Swiss male cyclists
Sportspeople from the canton of St. Gallen